Prince Makhosini Jaheso Dlamini (1914 – 28 April 1978) was Prime Minister of Eswatini from 16 May 1967 to 31 March 1976.

Dlamini was also the country's foreign minister from 1968 to 1970.

Honours
  Commemorative Medal of the 2500th Anniversary of the founding of the Persian Empire (Empire of Iran, 14 October 1971).

References

1914 births
1978 deaths
Swazi diplomats
Swazi royalty
Prime Ministers of Eswatini
Foreign Ministers of Eswatini